Hrvoje Vukčić Hrvatinić (ca. 1350–1416) was a medieval Bosnian nobleman and magnate, Grand Duke of Bosnia, Knyaz of Donji Kraji, and Duke of Split. He was the most prominent member of the Hrvatinić noble family, and one of the major feudal lords in Kingdom of Bosnia. He was Grand Duke of Bosnia under three Bosnian kings: King Tvrtko I, King Stephen Dabiša and King Stephen Ostoja.  In 1403 Ladislaus of Naples named him his deputy for Dalmatia, and bestowed him with a title Duke of Split, later Herzog of Split. He played a crucial role in the dynastic struggles between the Anjou and Luxembourg claimants to the Hungarian-Croatian throne at the end of the 14th century, as well as in the emergence of the Bosnian Kingdom as a regional power during the same period.

Family Connections 
Hrvoje was the eldest son of Duke Vukac Hrvatinić. He had three brothers: Vuk (who was Ban of Croatia), Dragiša and Vojislav. He was married to Jelena Nelipčić, granddaughter of the powerful Croatian noble Ivan I Nelipac (Prince Nelipić) and sister of Ivan III Nelipac (Ivaniš Nelipić). He is first mentioned in 1376 as being prince and knight during the reign of Hungarian king Louis I. The territories over which he reigned were the Donji Kraji in Medieval Bosnia, facing Croatia and Slavonia westwards.

Rise of Vukčić's power 

In the year 1380 he was made Grand Duke of Bosnia by Bosnian King Stjepan (Stephen) Tvrtko I of House of Kotromanić, granting him a seat in Lašva. In 1387 Hrvoje's first action as Grand Duke was leading a squadron of Bosnian troops to Croatia to raise the siege of Bishop Ivan Horvat in Zagreb. After the death of king Louis I he participated in the battles of succession between Sigismund of Luxembourg and Ladislaus of Naples. He sided with Ladislaus with the promise of becoming ban of Croatia and Dalmatia in 1391. During the reign of King Stephen Dabiša of Bosnia, he participated in the fights against the Ottoman Turks in Bosnia in 1392 - earning Dabiša's eternal gratitude. Hrvoje became Dabiša's main guarantee of staying at the throne - as he declared that he is a faithful servant of the Hungarian King in all cases but those that might damage King Dabiša in 1393. In the heat of internal struggles in Bosnia in 1397 during the reign of Queen Jelena Gruba Hrvoje invited the Ottomans to offer assistance. As an opposer of Queen Jelena, he participated in the selection of Stephen Ostoja as the new King of Bosnia in May 1398. Opposing King Sigismund's Hungarian pretensions, Hrvoje greatly influenced King Ostoja.

Duke Hrvoje opposed King Sigismund's rule in Bosnia and actively worked to bring Ladislaus of Naples as the new King of Hungary - that would leave Bosnia alone since 1389, and the same year King Sigismund invaded Bosnia. Duke Hrvoje defeated his forces before they reached the City of Vrbas and chased them across the river Una, invading and conquering the župa of Dubica. King Sigismund counterattacked in the fall by assaulting Bosnia. Here, Duke Hrvoje led the forces for King Stephen Ostoja, together with Duke Sandalj Hranić and Duke Pavle Radenović. By the end of 1402, Duke Hrvoje made all Dalmatian cities with the exception of Dubrovnik to recognize King Ladislaus' rule.

After the crowning of Ladislaus as the Croatian-Hungarian King in Zadar in 1403, and in political maneuvering against his arch political rival and enemy, the King Sigismund, he made Hrvoje his deputy for Dalmatia territory, as promised, calling him his Vicar General for the regions of Sclavonia (in partibus Sclavonie). He was also named Duke of Split, and given possessions on the islands of Brač, Hvar and Korčula. In 1406 Hrvoje Vukčić Hrvatinić fortified and strengthened Prozor Fortress over the Vrlika valley in Croatia, also given to him by Ladislaus of Naples.
He continually exerted his influence over Bosnia affairs. He came into conflict with King Ostoja and participated in the plot to remove him from the throne and replacing him with Tvrtko II Kotromanić in 1404. Together with Tvrtko II he formed a movement against Hungary and Sigismund of Luxembourg. After Sigismund's military intervention in 1408 and the massacre of the Bosnian army, he allied himself with Sigismund. However, Hungary's victory in Bosnia and the retaking of the throne by King Ostoja weakened him severely. He soon lost control over the islands he had been given, as well as Split. At this point, he sought help from the Ottoman Empire. The Hungarian army was defeated at Lašva in 1415, but this would open the door to Ottoman expansion into Bosnia. Hrvoje died the following year and was buried in the crypt of a his private underground chapel, located in the southern quarter within the walls of Jajce. His widow, Jelena Nelipčić, re-married to King Ostoja.

Hrvoje's Misal
During this time the Hval Manuscript and Hrvoje's Missal were written in Bosnian cyrillic and Glagolitic alphabets, respectively. The Hval Manuscript is now kept at the University of Bologna while Hrvoje's Missal is kept at the Topkapı Palace Museum Manuscript Library in Istanbul).

See also
Hrvoje's Missal
Prozor Fortress

References

Sources

 
 
 
 
 

h
1350 births
1416 deaths
Bosnian magnates
Grand Dukes of Bosnia
Order of the Dragon
Burials in Catacombs of Jajce
Hrvatinić